Padroni is an unincorporated town, a census-designated place (CDP), and a post office located in and governed by Logan County, Colorado, United States. The CDP is a part of the Sterling, CO Micropolitan Statistical Area. The Padroni post office has the ZIP Code 80745. At the United States Census 2010, the population of the Padroni CDP was 76, while the population of the 80745 ZIP Code Tabulation Area was 156 including adjacent areas.

History
Padroni was named for George and Tom Padroni, early settlers.

Geography
Padroni is located just northwest of the center of Logan County.

Demographics

See also

Outline of Colorado
Index of Colorado-related articles
State of Colorado
Colorado cities and towns
Colorado census designated places
Colorado counties
Logan County, Colorado
List of statistical areas in Colorado
Sterling, CO Micropolitan Statistical Area

References

External links

Padroni @ GhostTowns.com
Logan County website

Census-designated places in Logan County, Colorado
Census-designated places in Colorado
1909 establishments in Colorado